"Garden (Say It like Dat)" is a song by American singer SZA. It was released as the fifth and final single from June 19, 2018, from her debut album, Ctrl (2017). The song was serviced to Urban radios on June 19, 2018, by Top Dawg and RCA. The song was produced by Bēkon and additionally produced by Craig Balmoris.

Music video
The music video was released on May 20, 2018, and was directed by Karen Evans.

It showcases SZA singing in front of various landscapes with a "dreamy" atmosphere. 
It features scenes in a jungle where links with her lover portrayed by Childish Gambino following her cameo appearance in Childish Gambino's This Is America video. The video also features a cameo appearance by SZA's mother, Audrey Rowe who can also be heard throughout Ctrl in various discussions.

Live performances
The song was included in the set list of her Ctrl the Tour and performed various times.

Personnel
All credits adapted from Tidal, BMI and ASCAP

 Solana Imani Rowe – vocals, songwriting
 Craig Balmoris - songrwrting, production
 Daniel "Bekon" Tannenbaum - songrwrting, production, engineering
 Sergiu Adrian Gherman - songwriting
 Tyler Reese Melenbacher - songwriting
 Hector Castro - production, engineering
 Derek "MixedByAli" Ali - engineering
 The Donuts - production
 Danikeyz Productions - publishing
 Songs of Universal, INC. - publishing
 CALOWAYFROMBD - publishing
 CRAIG B OF BKS - publishing
 ONE77 SONGS - publishing
- SERGFROMBD  - publishing

Charts

Certifications

Release history

References

 2018 singles
SZA songs
Songs written by SZA
 Songs written by Daniel Tannenbaum